Oleg Piganovich (born May 12, 1985) is a Russian professional ice hockey defenseman currently an unrestricted free agent. He most recently played with HC Kunlun Red Star of the Kontinental Hockey League (KHL).

Playing career
Piganovich originally played with HC Dmitrov of the second tier, Russian Major League to start the 2005–06 season before he was traded to fellow league team Khimik Voskresensk.

Piganovich signed with Russian Superleague team, Traktor Chelyabinsk prior to the 2007–08 season and made his top level debut scoring 22 goals in 56 games.

After playing the 2013–14 season with HC Donbass, Piganovich was unable to fulfill his second year of his contract with the club, due to civil unrest suspending the teams involvement in the KHL. As a result, Piganovich returned to hometown club, Traktor Chelyabinsk on a one-year deal on June 30, 2014.

Piganovich after a years hiatus, returned to the KHL, playing as captain for HC Neftekhimik Nizhnekamsk in the 2017–18 season. He established new KHL career marks with 9 goals and 23 points in 53 regular season games.

On 20 July 2018, Piganovich agreed to a one-year contract as a free agent with HC Sibir Novosibirsk.

Career statistics

References

External links

1985 births
Living people
Amur Khabarovsk players
Avangard Omsk players
HC Donbass players
Russian expatriate sportspeople in Ukraine
Russian ice hockey defencemen
HC Khimik Voskresensk players
HC Kunlun Red Star players
HC Neftekhimik Nizhnekamsk players
HC Sibir Novosibirsk players
HC Spartak Moscow players
Torpedo Nizhny Novgorod players
Traktor Chelyabinsk players
Sportspeople from Yaroslavl